Kocakina is a genus of moths of the family Noctuidae. It contains only one species, Kocakina fidelis, the intractable quaker moth, which is found in North America, where it has been recorded from Quebec and Maine to Florida, west to Texas and Kansas. The habitat consists of dry woodlands. The former genus name, Himella, is a junior homonym, and was replaced by Kocakina in 2006.

The wingspan is 25–35 mm. The forewings are greyish to reddish-brown with yellowish lines and spots outlined with yellow. There is a distinct black spot on the basal line, as well as fainter black spots on the antemedial and postmedial lines near the inner margin. The hindwings are greyish-brown, darker toward the outer margin. Adults are on wing from March to May and again in July in one to two generations per year.

The larvae feed on the leaves of Quercus species, Prunus virginiana, Prunus serotina and Carya ovata. Full-grown larvae reach a length of about 30 mm. They have a green body with a white subdorsal stripe and four thin white lateral lines. The head is green. Larvae can be found from May to July. The species overwinters in the pupal stage.

References

Hadeninae